The Human Adventure is a game written by William F. Denman, Jr. and published by Med Systems Software in 1980 for the TRS-80 and Apple II.

Gameplay
The Human Adventure is a game which follows miniaturized scientists traveling through a person's bloodstream to fight cancer. The game is controlled via single-word commands.

Reception
Russ Williams reviewed The Human Adventure in The Space Gamer No. 47. Williams commented that "This is basically a nifty little game based on a popular SF theme.  It has the added advantage of being educational.  I learned more about human anatomy from this game than I did in my biology class!"

Reviews
Moves #60, p17-18
The S-Eighty

References

1980 video games
Apple II games
TRS-80 games